The 1992 Dayton Flyers football team was an American football team that represented the University of Dayton as an independent during the 1992 NCAA Division III football season. Led by 12th-year head coach Mike Kelly, the Flyers compiled a record of 10–1.

Schedule

References

Dayton
Dayton Flyers football seasons
Dayton Flyers football